Naman Ramachandran is an Indian critic and journalist. He is the author of Rajinikanth: The Definitive Biography (Penguin, 2012) and Lights Camera Masala: Making Movies in Mumbai (IBH, 2006). He writes for Variety, Sight & Sound, and Cineuropa. Based in London, he is also on the steering group of the London Indian Film Festival. He has also written the independent film Brahman Naman, which premiered at the 2016 Sundance Film Festival.

Early life 
Naman Ramachandran grew up in Alappuzha, Kerala. He later moved to Bangalore, Karnataka.

Works

Citations

References
 (a review of Rajinikanth)
http://timesofindia.indiatimes.com/entertainment/bengali/movies/Brahman-Naman-Q-Michael-Jackson/articleshow/26199535.cms?

http://www.thehindu.com/todays-paper/tp-features/tp-literaryreview/explosive-eye-candy/article2274587.ece

External links

English-language writers from India
20th-century Indian biographers
Indian film critics
Indian male journalists
Journalists from London
Living people
Magazine writers
Place of birth missing (living people)
Year of birth missing (living people)
20th-century Indian male writers
Variety (magazine) people
Male biographers